L'Aigle is a L6 meteorite that fell on 26 April 1803 in Lower Normandy, France.

History
In the early afternoon of 26 April 1803 a meteorite shower of more than 3000 fragments fell upon the town of L'Aigle in Normandy, France. Upon hearing of this event the French Academy of Sciences sent the young scientist Jean-Baptiste Biot to investigate that spectacular fall of stones. After painstaking work in the field he reported two kinds of evidence pointing to an extraterrestrial origin for the stones:
 Physical evidence: the sudden appearance of many identical stones similar to other stones fallen from the sky in other places
 Moral evidence: many witnesses who observed a "rain of stones thrown by the meteor"
Biot's passionate paper describing how these stones must undoubtedly be of extraterrestrial origin effectively gave birth to the science of meteoritics.
The L'Aigle event was a milestone in the understanding of meteorites and their origins because at that time the mere existence of meteorites was harshly debated. If they were recognised, their origin was controversial, with most commentators agreeing with Aristotle that they were terrestrial, and witnessed meteorite falls were treated with great skepticism. The meteorite has since been stored along with Angers, another meteorite that struck France 19 years later, in a room at the Muséum d'histoire naturelle d'Angers, a French natural history museum.

Composition and classification
It is a L6 type ordinary chondrite.

See also 
 Glossary of meteoritics
 Meteorite

References

External links 
 Meteoritical Bulletin Database: L'Aigle

Meteorites found in France
History of Normandy
1803 in France
1803 in science
Orne